The 1988 Angus District Council election took place on the 5 May 1988 to elect members of Angus District Council, as part of that years Scottish local elections.

Election results

References

1988 Scottish local elections
1988